Sahi Shabda is a 1995 Nepali language thesaurus written by Father William Bourke SJ. It is the first comprehensive Nepali thesaurus. It was published 1995 and won the Madan Puraskar, 2051 B.S.; the highest literary honor of Nepal.

About the author 
Father William Bourke SJ was born in May 28, 1925 in Halifax, Nova Scotia, Canada. He moved to Darjeeling in 1954 and served as a Headmaster for St. Robert's School, Darjeeling from 1981 to 1990. He also translated The Bible into Nepali and wrote a book called 'Proverbs for Today', a collection of Nepali and English proverbs. He died in Nov. 29, 2019 of natural causes; aged 94.

Reception 
The book won the Madan Puraskar. The award is given annually for a book in Nepali language by Madan Puraskar Guthi.

See also 

 Hamro Lok Sanskriti
 Karnali Lok Sanskriti
 Srasta ra Sahitya

References 

Nepali language
Dictionaries

Nepalese books
Nepalese non-fiction books
Madan Puraskar-winning works